Asuras are a class of beings or power-seeking clans, related to the more benevolent devas (also known as suras) in Hinduism.

Clans

The two major clans of the asuras are the daityas and the danavas.
 Daitya - a clan of asuras
 Dānava - a clan of asuras (Known as Dānaveghasā in Buddhism)
 Rakshasa - a class of beings sometimes categorised as synonymous with asuras

Legend
 ॐ - mentioned in Hindu scriptures
 ☸ - mentioned in Buddhist scriptures

A
 Adi ॐ
 Aghāsura ॐ
 Anthkashur ॐ
 Anuhlāda - Son of Hiraṇyakaśipu  
 Apasmāra ॐ☸
 Aśva - Son of Diti ॐ
 Āyu - Son of Hiranyakaśipu (Harivaṃśa) ॐ
 Alāmbāsa - A powerful asura in the Hindu epic Mahabharata ॐ
 Alāmvūshā - A powerful asura from the Mahabharata ॐ
 Alāyūdhā - A powerful asura from the epic Mahabharata ॐ

B
 Bhandāsura - asura slain by Tripura Sundari
 Bali - An king of vanar sena  ॐ☸卐
 Bāṇāsura  - warred against Krishna ॐ
 Bhasmāsura ॐ
 Bakāsura - slain by Bhima ॐ
Bakasura - slain by Krishna

C
 Chanda ॐ
 Candravarma ॐ

D
 Danu - Mother of the dānavas ॐ☸
 Darika ॐ
 Dhenuka ॐ
 Dūṣaṇa ॐ
 Dhumralochana ॐ

G
 Gajāsura - The name of several asuras who take the form of an elephant ॐ
 Gayāsura ॐ

H
 Hiraṇyakaśipu ॐ
 Hiraṇyākṣa ॐ
 Hlāda - Son of Hiraṇyakaśipu ॐ
 Holikā ॐ

I
 Ilvala - Also referred to as Atapi ॐ
 Indrajit (rakshasa) ॐ

J
 Jālāndhāra ॐ
 Jvārāsura ॐ☸
Jātāsuraॐ

K
 Kamsa - A powerful king killed by Krishna, referred to as an asura in the Padma Purana ॐ
 Kaiṭabha ॐ
 Kakasura ॐ
 Kāla - Son of Hiraṇyakaśipu (Harivaṃśa) ॐ
 Kali - Ruler of the Kali Yuga ॐ

 Kālanemi ॐ
 Kālayāvana ॐ
 Karambha ॐ
  Karindrāsura ॐ
 Keśī - An asura horse slain by Krishna ॐ
 Ketu - Personification of the descending lunar node ॐ☸卐
 Kābāndhā - A powerful rakshasa from the Ramayana ॐ
 Khara ॐ
 Kamlasura - Slain by Ganesha

M
 Mada ॐ
 Mudha ॐ
 Mahābali- An asura king exiled to the underworld by Vamana (avatar of Vishnu) ॐ☸卐
 Mahiṣāsura ॐ
  Mallanāga ॐ
  Mandodarī ॐ
 Mayāsura - An asura king ॐ
  Meghanāda - Another name of Indrajit ॐ
Maricha
 Mitra - A former asura also classed among the Devas ॐ
 Mukāsura ॐ
 Munda ॐ
  Murāsura ॐ

N
  Namuci - In Buddhism, an epithet of Māra ॐ☸卐
 Narakāsura ॐ
 Niśumbha ॐ

P
 Pahārāda - An asura king ☸
 Praheti ॐ
 Prahlada - Son of Hiraṇyakaśipu ॐ
 Pralamba ॐ
Pūtanā ॐ

R
 Rāhu - Personification of the eclipse and an asura king ॐ☸卐
 Raktabīja ॐ
 Rambha ॐ
 Ravana (rakshasa)

S
 Saṁbara ॐ
 Saṁhlāda - Son of Hiraṇyakaśipu ॐ
 Śibi - Son of Hiraṇyakaśipu (Harivaṃśa) ॐ
 Śukra - The 'guru' of the asuras and personification of the planet Venus ॐ
 Somaprabhā - Daughter of Mayāsura ॐ
 Sucitti (Pali) - Present at the teaching of the Mahāsamaya Sutta ☸
 Sugriva (asura) ॐ
 Sujā - Daughter of the asura king Vemacitrin ☸
 Śumbha ॐ
 Sunda ॐ
 Śūrapadmā ॐ
 Svarbhānu ॐ
 Sumālī - Rāvaṇa's grandfather and also a rākṣasa ॐ

T
 Tārakāsura ॐ
 Trinavarta ॐ
 Tripurāsura ॐ
 Triśiras ॐ

U
 Upasunda ॐ
 Ūṣā ॐ

V

 Vātāpi ॐ
 Vemacitrin - An asura king ॐ☸
 Vipracitti - A dānava king ॐ
 Virocana ॐ
 Virūpākṣa ॐ
 Viśvarūpa - Another name for Triśiras ॐ
 Vṛkāsura ॐ
 Vṛṣaparva ॐ
 Vṛṣaśipta ॐ
 Vṛtra - A draconic asura slain by Indra ॐ☸
 Vyomāsura ॐ

List of asuras slain by Krishna 
In the Puranas and other texts of Hindu literature, the deity Krishna is attacked by a number of asuras and rakshasas sent by his uncle Kamsa, as well as others he encounters and slays in his legends.

 Putana - A rakshasi who was sent by Kamsa to appear in the form of a beautiful woman to kill baby Krishna by breastfeeding him poison, but who was killed by the deity when he sucked her life-force out, and was granted liberation.
 Sakaṭāsura - A cart-demon sent by Kamsa to crush a three-month old Krishna, but was reduced to pieces by the infant with a single kick.
 Trinavarta - a whirl-wind demon who abducted the child Krishna and carried him to the sky, but was choked by the deity and crushed to death against a rock upon his descent.
 Vatsasura - A calf-demon who attacked a cattle-herding Krishna in Vrindavana, whose legs were whirled about and hurled to death under a kapittha tree.
 Bakasura - A crane-demon who attempted to swallow Krishna in Gokulam, but was forced to throw up, upon which Krishna snapped his beak and slew him.
 Aghasura - A snake-demon who lured Krishna's cowherd friends into his mouth, but was slain when Krishna expanded in size inside him and burst out his form.
 Arishtasura - A bull-demon who charged against Krishna, and met his end when the deity seized his horns and kicked him with his foot.
 Keshi - A horse-demon who dueled against Krishna and attacked him with his hooves, and perished when the deity thrusted his left arm into Keshi's mouth.
 Vyomasura - A sky-demon who abducted Krishna's friends inside caves, and was slain when Krishna hurled him against the earth and suffocated him.
 Śaṅkhacūḍa - A jealous asura who abducted a number of gopis at Vrindavana, slain by Krishna in a fight.
 Cāṇūra - a pugilist asura who served Kamsa, slain by Krishna in a wrestling match. 
 Kamsa - The tyrannical ruler of Mathura and uncle of Krishna who was slain to fulfil a prophecy, regarded as an asura by the Padma Purana.
 Pañcajana - A conch-shaped asura who slew Krishna's perceptor's son, destroyed by Krishna under the sea.
 Shishupala - the cousin of Krishna, previously betrothed to the deity's chief consort Rukmini, beheaded after he insulted Krishna 101 times.
 Dantavakrta - the incarnation of Vijaya slain by Krishna.
 Kalayavana - An asura king who was killed by Krishna by tricking him into waking Muchukunda.
 Narakasura - A powerful asura ruler slain by Krishna, and his wife Satyabhama, with the Sudarshana Chakra.

See also
 Rakshasa
 Daityas
 Danavas
 Rigvedic deities

References

 
Asuras
Buddhism-related lists